The 119th district of the Texas House of Representatives contains parts of southern and eastern San Antonio. The district also includes parts of China Grove, Converse, Schertz, Universal City, and Live Oak. The current Representative is Elizabeth Campos, who was first elected in 2020.

References 

119